Ernst von Hesse-Wartegg (21 February 1851 – 17 May 1918) was an Austrian – American writer and traveller.  He was consul of Venezuela in Switzerland (1888–1918). He completed 29 books and close to 700 journal articles.

Biography 
Ernst von Hesse-Wartegg's origins are unknown, but he was thought to have been born in or near Vienna, Austria. He had a daughter born out of wedlock who tried in vain to prove her family roots in the 1930s. In 2012 several research teams could not find more information, only in results published in 2017 it was demonstrated that Hesse-Wartegg was Austrian by birth, but adopted the US American citizenship in 1887. In 1878, he married the American opera singer Minnie Hauk (1851–1929). Starting 1889 they lived in their villa in Tribschen, near Lucerne, Switzerland.

Throughout his life he went on travels worldwide. In 1872 he went to South-Eastern Europe, 1876 was his first trip to the US. Trips in the years 1880 to Tunis, 1881 to Egypt, and 1883 to Canada and Mexico followed, as well as several trips to the US. His next important travels were 1887 to Venezuela, and 1892 to Morocco and Spain. In 1894 he went on a trip around the world with South and East Asia as major stops: India, Singapore, Hong-Kong, China, Japan and Korea. In 1898 he was back to China. A trip to the German colonies in the Pacific followed in 1900, and in 1901 he travelled to India and Ceylon. His last long trips were to Brazil in the years 1903, 1910 and 1913. He died at Tribschen, near Lucerne, Switzerland.

Mark Twain and Karl May, amongst others, borrowed from his geographical descriptions for their own works.

Works (selection) 
 Die Werkzeugmaschinen zur Metall- und Holzbearbeitung. Leipzig 1874
 Der unterseeische Tunnel zwischen England und Frankreich. Leipzig 1875
 Atlantische Seebäder. Vienna 1878
 Prairiefahrten. Leipzig 1878
 Nord-Amerika, seine Städte und Naturwunder, sein Land und seine Leute, Leipzig 1880
 Mississippifahrten. Leipzig 1881
 Tunis, Land und Leute. Vienna 1882; Wuppertal 2007 
 Canada und Neufundland. Freiburg im Breisgau 1888
 Mexiko, Land und Leute. Wien 1890
 Tausend und ein Tag im Occident. 3 Bde. Dresden 1896
 Die Einheitszeit nach Studenzonen. Dresden 1892
 Chicago, eine Großstadt im amerikanischen Westen. Stuttgart 1892
 Curiosa aus der Neuen Welt. Leipzig 1893
 Andalusien. Leipzig 1894
 Korea. Dresden 1895
 China und Japan. Leipzig 1897
 Schan-tung und Deutsch-China. Leipzig 1897
 Siam, das Reich des weißen Elefanten. Leipzig 1899
 
 Indien und seine Fürstenhöfe. Leipzig 1906
 Die Wunder der Welt. 1912
 Zwischen Anden und Amazonas. Stuttgart 1915
 Die Balkanstaaten und ihre Völker. Regensburg 1917

Works in English (selection) 
 The caravan route between Egypt and Syria. By Ludwig Salvator, translated by Ernst von Hesse-Wartegg. 1881.
 Tunis. The Land and the People. London, New York 1882
 The New South-West. Travelling Sketches from Kansas, New Mexico, Arizona and Northern Mexico. London. 1883.
 Across Nebraska by Train in 1877. Translated by Frederic Trautmann. 1984
 Travels on the Lower Mississippi 1879–1880. Translated by Frederic Trautmann. Columbia. 1990

Works in Danish (selection) 

 Nordamerika på Kryds og Tvers – Skildringer fra nutiden – 1892 Nordstjernens Hovedekspedition

Further reading 
 Hesse-Wartegg Ernst in: Österreichisches Biographisches Lexikon 1815–1950 (ÖBL). Vol. 2, Verlag der Österreichischen Akademie der Wissenschaften, Vienna 1959, p. 305.

 Andreas Dutz and Elisabeth Dutz: Ernst von Hesse-Wartegg. Reiseschriftsteller, Wissenschaftler, Lebemann. Böhlau-Verlag, Vienna 2017 (detailed biography and bibliography)

See also 
 List of Austrian writers

External links 
 
 
 Wonders of the World: photos, photos from the book "Wonders of the World" published in 1912, on the website of Serbia Travel Club.

1851 births
1918 deaths
Austrian male writers